Abdirahman Mohamed Husen is a Somali politician. Before entering politics, he served as President of SIMAD University. He was the Minister of Interior and Federal Affairs of Somalia, having been appointed to the position on 27 January 2015 by the then Prime Minister Omar Abdirashid Ali Sharmarke. He hails from the Saleeban Habargidir clan. He is a fierce critic of Farmaajo.

References

Living people
Government ministers of Somalia
Year of birth missing (living people)